Rahlstedt is a quarter (Stadtteil) in the Wandsbek borough (Bezirk) of the Free and Hanseatic city of Hamburg in northern Germany. In 2020, the population was 92,511.

History
The quarter was first mentioned in 1248 with the name of "Radoluestede".

Geography
The quarter, situated in the north-eastern side of Hamburg, is the largest one of its boroughs and one of the most extensive of the city. It borders with Hamburg's quarters of Volksdorf, Farmsen-Berne, Tonndorf and Jenfeld; and with the district of Stormarn, in Schleswig-Holstein.

The stream Wandse, originating near the municipality Siek (district Stormarn), and its confluents Rahlau, Stellau and Stellmoorer Quellfluss, is running through Rahlstedt. The Rahlau flows into the Wandse near Nordmarkstraße, whereas the Stellau does near Wilhelm-Grimm-Straße. The Stellmoorer Quellfluss within the Stellmoorer Tunneltal.

The most significant features, remains from the ice age, are located within the nature reserves Stellmoorer Tunneltal and Höltigbaum.

The Rahlstedt Cemetery contains 19,000 graves, including that of the 19th century poet Detlev von Liliencron.

Demographics
In 2006 86,413 people lived in the Rahstedt quarter. Resident aliens were 9% of the population. 3,983 people were registered as unemployed.

In 1999 there were 41,301 households, out of which 22.4% had children under the age of 18 living with them and 38.8% of all households were made up of individuals. The average household size was 2.05.

Education
Among the schools in Rahlstedt are Gymnasium Oldenfelde, Gymnasium Rahlstedt, Gymnasium Meiendorf, and Neue Schule Hamburg.

Notes

References 

 Selectable database: Statistical office Hamburg and Schleswig-Holstein Statistisches Amt für Hamburg und Schleswig-Holstein.

External links
 
 Rahlstedt official site

Quarters of Hamburg
Wandsbek